Wyre Davies is a Welsh journalist, and South America correspondent for BBC News. He speaks fluent Welsh and Spanish.

Background
Subsequently abandoned by her crew, salvage efforts were also abandoned on 6 June. Survivors including Captain Rowlands were rescued by a Short Sunderland aircraft of 10 Squadron, Royal Australian Air Force. Rowlands later retired to Llanrhystud, where Davies was born.

Career
After studying Latin American politics at university, he joined BBC News where he became a foreign correspondent in Latin America. In 2000 he transferred to a job as correspondent at BBC Wales, reporting on stories across Wales and appearing on Wales Today together with the BBC's Six and Ten o'clock news. He also reported on sports stories.

In 2005, he was asked to fill in for Katya Adler for six months while she took maternity leave. He has since undertaken occasional assignments to both Palestine and Israel, and in April 2010 was appointed permanent Middle East correspondent, under fellow Welshman, BBC Middle East editor Jeremy Bowen.  He covered the 2011 Egyptian protests from within Tahrir Square.

Since mid-2013, Davies is based in Rio de Janeiro, Brazil with his family, and is the BBC's South American correspondent.

Personal life
Davies is married, with three daughters and one Son. His close friends include BBC correspondent Alan Johnston, who was kidnapped in Gaza in 2007.

References

External links

Radio Wales Drive with Wyre Davies (BBC Radio Wales)
Wyre Davies @ journalisted

Year of birth missing (living people)
Living people
Welsh-language television presenters
Welsh journalists
BBC Cymru Wales newsreaders and journalists
BBC newsreaders and journalists
British expatriates in Israel
British expatriates in Brazil